The Sinner's prayer (also called the Consecration prayer and Salvation prayer) is an evangelical Christian term referring to any prayer of repentance, prayed by individuals who feel sin in their lives and have the desire to form or renew a personal relationship with God through Jesus Christ. It is a popular prayer in evangelical circles. It is not intended as liturgical like a creed or a confiteor said or chanted within the Catholic Mass, but rather, is intended to be an act of initial conversion to Christianity; at the same time, it is roughly analogous to the Catholic Act of Contrition, though the theology behind each is markedly different, due to the intrinsically different views of salvation between Catholicism and Protestantism. While some Christians see reciting the sinner's prayer as the moment defining one's salvation, others see it as a beginning step of one's lifelong faith journey.

It also may be prayed as an act of "re-commitment" for those who are already believers in the faith. Often, at the end of a worship service, in what is known as an altar call, a minister or other worship leader will invite those desiring to receive Christ (thus becoming born again) to repeat with him or her the words of some form of a sinner's prayer. It also is frequently found on printed gospel tracts, urging people to "repeat these words from the bottom of your heart".

The Sinner's prayer takes various forms, all of which have the same general thrust. Since it is considered a matter of one's personal will, it can be prayed silently, aloud, read from a suggested model, or repeated after someone modeling the prayer role. There is no formula of specific words considered essential, although it usually contains an admission of sin and a petition asking that Jesus enter into the person's heart (that is to say, the center of their life). The use of the sinner's prayer is common within some Protestant denominations, such as Baptist Churches and Methodist Churches, as well as in movements that span several denominations, including evangelical, fundamentalist, and charismatic Christianity. It has also been used, though not as widely, by some Anglicans, Lutherans, and Roman Catholics. It is sometimes uttered by Christians seeking redemption or reaffirming their faith in Christ during a crisis or disaster, when death may be imminent.

Because no such prayer or conversion is found in the Bible, some biblical scholars have critiqued the sinner's prayer, calling it a "cataract of nonsense" and an "apostasy". David Platt has raised questions over the authenticity of the conversions of people using the Sinner's prayer based on research by George Barna.

Origins 

The Sinner's prayer, as popularly known today, has roots in Protestant Christianity. Some affirm that it evolved, in some form or another, during the early days of the Protestant Reformation, as a reaction against the notion of justification by means of meritorious works. Others believe it originated as late as the 18th century revival movement. However, Paul Harrison Chitwood, in his doctoral dissertation on the history of the Sinner's prayer, provides strong evidence that the Sinner's prayer originated in the early 20th century.

Evangelists such as Billy Graham and evangelistic organizations such as Campus Crusade for Christ brought the concept to prominence in the 20th century. Televangelists often ask viewers to pray a Sinner's prayer with them, one phrase at a time, to become a Christian. Quite commonly, such a prayer appears at the conclusion of a tract and is recited in a religious service or other public service as an invitation for congregants to affirm their faith, sometimes as part of an altar call. It is said to happen many times every day around the world—in one-to-one conversations between friends, relatives, and even strangers; in pastors' offices; via email; in online chat rooms; in addition to both small and large worship services.

Typical examples 

An early proponent of the sinner's prayer was the well-known American evangelist D. L. Moody.

An early version of what some would consider the Sinner's prayer is found in Pilgrim's Progress by John Bunyan, published in 1678, Ninth Stage, Chapter 18:

Various other versions of the prayer include:

Support 

The Peace with God organization, and other evangelistic organizations and preachers, messengers (delegates) to the Southern Baptist Convention (SBC) 2012 annual meeting reaffirmed the Sinner's prayer after some debate:

Criticisms 

The absence of any specific examples of people praying the Sinner's prayer in the Bible is also used by some to argue against it. There are also no examples of conversions in the Bible with people praying such a prayer. Though a more prominent concern is voiced by these authors mentioned below who say it creates within the sinner a false sense of security.

"Authentic Conversions?"

David Platt, a prominent Southern Baptist pastor in Birmingham, Alabama, has said that "Many assume they are saved simply because of a prayer they prayed. It's not that praying a prayer in and of itself is bad—but the question in John 2-3 is what kind of faith are we calling people to?" Speaking at The Verge Church leaders' conference said the emphasis on the Sinner's prayer is "unbiblical and damning." He continued, 

Platt says he is concerned that some people "say they believe in Jesus, …say they have accepted Jesus, …say that they have received Jesus, but they are not saved and will not enter the kingdom of heaven". While he affirmed that people calling out to God with repentant faith is fundamental to attaining eternal life (salvation), he said his comments about the "sinner's prayer" have been deeply motivated "by a concern for authentic conversions".

Subsequently, he has written:

Francis Chan, a well-known evangelical Christian, has been making statements that contradict the Sinner's prayer and emphasizing baptism and the Holy Spirit

Possibly shallow, or insincere commitment 

A second and related criticism is that many believers fail to mature as Christians after their supposed conversion using the Sinner's prayer. An article in Christianity Today claims that "mediocrity and hypocrisy characterize the lives of many avowed Christians".

The writer encourages believers to go beyond a Sinner's prayer and "embark on a life fully devoted to the love of God, the love of neighbor, the moral practice of God's will, and radical, costly discipleship". "Love of God" and "Love of neighbor" are the Great Commandments (see also Disciple (Christianity)).

Lack of Biblical presence

Another criticism of the Sinner's prayer is that passages used to support it actually are not about the lost repeating a prayer in order to become Christians. The Sinner's prayer is often employed in conjunction with Revelation 3:20 and Romans 10:9-10, 13.  Revelation 3:20 is employed to teach that Christ is knocking at the door of one's heart, and when a lost person asks him to come inside, Jesus comes into the sinner's heart. Romans 10:9-10, 13 are employed to affirm that one must confess with his mouth, that is, say the Sinner's prayer, in order to become a Christian. However, the Baptist Greek professor Thomas Ross argues that Revelation 3:20 is about members of a church turning to the Lord, not about Christ entering into the heart of the lost. He provides 14 reasons that Revelation 3:20 is not about the lost asking Jesus into their hearts to become saved. He similarly argues that Romans 10:9-14 refers to Christians confessing Christ publicly before men and manifesting a life of prayer, rather than to the lost becoming saved by a one-time repetition of the Sinner's prayer.

Another form of this criticism of the Sinner's prayer states that simply praying the Sinner's prayer does not actually grant salvation to the one praying. One essay on the topic from the "Christian Apologetics and Research Ministry" asserts that "The 'Sinner's Prayer' is, today, an effective tool of Satan to dupe people into believing they are saved when they are not".

Absence of the Sinner's prayer in historic Christianity

Other opponents of the Sinner's prayer point out that no classic Christian confession of faith from any evangelical denomination in Christendom affirms that one must say the Sinner's prayer to be saved; on the contrary, Baptist, Presbyterian and other Reformed, and other evangelical groups unanimously teach justification by faith alone. They argue that the Sinner's prayer is a modern deviation from orthodox evangelicalism and a deviation from classic evangelical methods of evangelism. The Sinner's prayer was not practiced before the 1700s. Therefore, to say that it is the way to be saved is to say that prior to the 1700s no-one was saved.

Doctrine of baptismal regeneration 

Baptismal regenerationalists—those Christians who believe that when one is baptized in water is the actual moment that an individual receives salvation—include Roman Catholics, Lutherans, some Anglicans, the Churches of Christ, International Churches of Christ, and Christian churches and churches of Christ. This is based on passages in the New Testament that some interpret to require water baptism for salvation.

Jesus was baptized in water by John the Baptist. His disciples baptized converts, and Jesus personally baptized people, according to John 3:22 which says that "Jesus...spent some time with [the disciples], and baptized." This is not in opposition to John 4:1 which says that "Jesus Himself did not baptize, but His disciples" did. Throughout the gospels we see Jesus teaching and training the disciples to be powerful and effective at converting people. He showed them how in John 3, and by John 4 they were able to baptize on their own. Opponents of baptismal regeneration understand baptism to be a means of identifying with Christ, and that when performed by immersion it is symbolic of his death, burial and resurrection. Some dispensationalists believe the baptism that saves a person is the Baptism with the Holy Spirit that Jesus gives, and not water baptism, (1 Peter 3:21). Many other evangelicals and fundamentalists recognize that texts such as Mark 16:16, John 3:5, and Acts 2:38 refer to baptism in water, but argue that such verses, interpreted in their context, provide no support whatsoever for baptismal regeneration. Historic or Landmark Baptists affirm that the baptism with the Holy Spirit was a completed event that took place in the first century and is not for today, arguing that texts employed to support baptismal regeneration are actually totally consistent with justification by faith alone,(James 2:18-26).

Roman Catholics, Lutherans, and Orthodox churches also teach that forgiveness is received in baptism (although they practice this in the "Christening" with water of infants or adult converts). A leading Roman Catholic authority defines "baptism" in the following fashion:

Evidence presented to advocate baptism being necessary for salvation includes the conversion of Saul of Tarsus (the Apostle Paul). After Christ had told Saul to enter Damascus where Saul would be told what he "must" do, Saul was blind for three days and was praying during this time. Ananias arrived, cured Paul of his blindness and baptized Saul.

Others see it as an example of apparently instantaneous salvation coming through repentance without water baptism or any kind of work, citing the assurance Jesus gave to the penitent thief on a cross next to him during the crucifixion.

An opposing position here is that the penitent thief was dying under the older Mosaic law which did not require baptism (cf. Mikveh) and that before Christ's death He had authority and did forgive many without any of the salvation requirements found after His Death, Burial and Resurrection found in the rest of the New Testament. Additionally, it is unknown whether the thief had been baptized at a stage in life before being crucified. John the Baptist and Jesus' disciples already had baptized many individuals.

Baptismal regenerationists refer to water baptism as the "washing of regeneration", (1 Cor 6:11/John 3:5) believing it to be part of the "born again" conversion experience in the Bible. The passage states, "And now why tarriest thou? Arise, and be baptized, and wash away thy sins, calling on the name of the Lord". Opponents of baptismal regeneration argue that vast numbers of texts in John's Gospel, the only specifically evangelistic book of the New Testament (John 20:31), promise eternal life to every single believer (John 1:12; 3:16, 18, 36; 5:24; 6:47, etc.) and so demonstrate that eternal life is received by faith alone before baptism.  Similarly, while texts affirm that those who do not repent and believe are damned (Luke 13:3; Jn 3:18, 36), The Bible also shows in Biblical text that the unbaptized are damned, (Mark 16:16/Revelation 22:14 ESV). So baptismal regeneration is Bible-based.  Advocates of the Sinner's Prayer also believe verses such as Romans 10:13 show that people are saved before baptism when they pray and ask to be saved, while evangelical and fundamentalist opponents of the Sinner's Prayer believe that a defense of the Sinner's Prayer plays into the hands of opponents of justification by faith alone by enshrining a human tradition over the Biblical mandate to repent and believe to receive eternal life (Mr 1:15). Moreover, opponents of the Sinner's Prayer reference Romans 6:3-5 to assert that the audience of the book of Romans was already baptized, and, therefore, were being instructed to call on the name of the Lord after they had heard and believed the message being preached (Acts 10:14-17). Other verses such as Acts 22:16 suggest that baptism and "calling on His name" are complementary actions required for forgiveness of sins.

See also 

 Christian views on the old covenant
 Conversion to Christianity
 Decision theology
 Evangelism
 Jesus Prayer
 Journey into Life, a widely used tract ending with such a prayer
 Lord's Prayer
 Ministry of Jesus
 Proselytism
 Shahada

References

External links 
 The Sinner’s Prayer:  A Historical and Theological Analysis, by Paul Harrison Chitwood (Ph. D. Dissertation, Southern Baptist Theological Seminary, 2001)

Christian prayer
Christian terminology
Conversion to Christianity
Evangelical theology
Protestantism-related controversies
Salvation in Protestantism